Spheginobaccha is a genus of hoverflies, with 15 known species. The genus is readily separated from other microdons by the incomplete metathoracic bridge, round/oval basoflagellomere, occiput with a dorsolateral crease,
and other characters.

Biology
Larvae are found in ant nests.

Distribution
They are native to Africa (five species) and Asia (eight species).

Species

The macropoda group (Asia):
S. aethusa (Walker, 1849)
S. chillcotti Thompson, 1974
S. demeijerei van Doesburg, 1968
S. duplex (Walker, 1857)
S. humeralis (Sack, 1926)
S. knutsoni Thompson, 1974
S. lieftincki Doesburg, 1968
S. macropoda (Bigot, 1883)
S. melancholia Hull, 1937
S. vandoesburgi Thompson, 1974

The rotundiceps group (South Africa):
S. dexioides Hull, 1944
S. dubia Thompson, 1974
S. pamela Thompson & Hauser, 2015
S. rotundiceps (Loew, 1857)
S. stuckenbergi Thompson & Hauser, 2015

The perialla group (Malawi):
S. perialla Thompson, 1974

The ruginosa group (Madagascar):
S. ruginosa Dirickx, 1995

References

Hoverfly genera
Microdontinae
Diptera of Africa
Diptera of Asia